Kaeloo is a French computer-animated comedy television series. The first season, comprising 52 episodes, each seven minutes long, was dubbed into English. The second, third, and fourth seasons have not been dubbed into English yet. The series is a CGI cartoon by Rémi Chapotot and Jean-François Henry and produced by Cube Creative associated with Blue Spirit. The series has been airing from June 6, 2010, on Canal+, Canal+ Kids and Télétoon+, and also started airing from September 2017 on C8, and the show is no longer airs on Family CHRGD since August 31, 2016.

Overview 
The show centers around the adventures of a group of anthropomorphic animals buddies, Kaeloo (Kaelou in the Pilot), Stumpy, (Moignon in the Pilot), Quack-Quack, Mr. Cat, and of Season 2, Pretty, Eugly and Olaf, who play games to keep themselves from getting bored. Things always go wrong due to Stumpy's ineptitude at almost everything, Quack-Quack's addiction to yogurt, Pretty's unkindness, Eugly's emotional vulnerability, Olaf's desire to take over the world, Mr. Cat's constant cheating and abuse of the others, and most of all, Kaeloo's ability to transform into a hulking monster named Bad Kaeloo when angered.

Characters

Main 
 Kaeloo/Kaelou (voiced by Emmanuel Garijo in French and Andy Chase (Pilot), Doug Rand (Season 1) in English) - The titular character and main protagonist. She is a kind-hearted and imaginative but emotionally unstable tree frog who's always looking for games to play with her so-called "buddies". When pushed too far, Kaeloo enters an intense rage that transforms her into the hulking "Bad Kaeloo".  Throughout the series, it is heavily implied that Kaeloo may have a crush on Mr. Cat, who also happens to have a crush on her. She is female in most of the dubs of the series; however, the Italian, Serbian and Hindi dubs, as well as the first 10 episodes in the English dub have her re-written as male, with the former three dubs editing out any suggestive scene between her and Mr. Cat.
 Stumpy/Moignon (voiced by Rémi Chapotot in French and Doug Rand (Pilot and Season 1)) - Uneducated and immature, Stumpy the red squirrel loves anything that is dangerous. He has little to no sense of reality and is not very intelligent. He is fascinated by adventure, explosions, superpowers, intergalactic wars and the like. Stumpy aspires to be like his idol, comic book hero Mr. Coolskin. He hates books without pictures, being made fun of, other people touching his things, and washing. Whenever he doesn't understand something (which is often), is afraid or otherwise agitated, he spouts gibberish as his neck spasms erratically.
 Quack-Quack/Coin-Coin (voiced by Rémi Chapotot in French and Doug Rand in English) - An injured mallard duck, Whilst still in his egg, his parents were killed by a hunter. He was taken into a laboratory as a duckling and repeatedly experimented on. He was made indestructible, intelligent, extremely lucky and addicted to yogurt. He is afraid of three things: doctors, never finding his creator and expired yogurt. He is incapable of speech, only able to say "quack", and is Mr. Cat's favorite punching bag.
 Mr. Cat/Monsieur Chat (voiced by Philippe Spiteri in French and Christian Erickson (Pilot), Mike Powers (Season 1) in English) - A proud, macho, perverted, alcoholic, sadomasochistic, selfish, cruel, greedy tabby cat who always wants to win, whatever the means and is even willing to cheat to do so. He especially enjoys torturing Quack-Quack, which upsets Kaeloo and is the usual cause of her transformation into Bad Kaeloo. Despite (or perhaps because of) Kaeloo's transformations, he seems to have developed a crush on her; the feeling is reciprocated, and while they are not officially a couple, the other characters often talk about their feelings for each other and about them becoming a couple. As a result of this crush, he occasionally tries to make romantic advances towards her, which she rejects; in cases where Kaeloo makes advances on him, he also rejects her for unknown reasons. Despite all of the factors mentioned above, he is Kaeloo's closest friend and remains loyal to her even when others, including Stumpy and Quack-Quack, turn against her. It is implied in several episodes that he had an extremely difficult past and had terrible relationships with his family, especially his brothers. Over the course of the series, however, he does become much nicer while still retaining his mean self.
 Bad Kaeloo (voiced by Emmanuel Garijo in French and Doug Rand (Season 1) in English) - The hulking, massive toad into which Kaeloo transforms when angry or threatened. While Kaeloo has stated in an early episode that the transformations must be triggered by anger, she has been seen in several episodes deliberately taking this form to cheat at games that require a level of physical prowess or to intimidate others. The transformations seem to be accompanied by a profound drop in intellectual capacity and reasoning, later followed by remorse once she returns to her "normal" form. This implies that Bad Kaeloo's actions are usually beyond her conscious control. It is hinted at in one episode that this personality will become the dominant one later in her life, though another episode set in the future contradicted this.

Secondary 

The second season of the show, which aired in France but was not yet dubbed into English, introduced a few secondary characters:
 Pretty (voiced by Dorothée Pousséo) - A narcissistic, selfish and annoying female rabbit who is obsessed with fashion and all things stereotypically "girly". Pretty has a crush on Mr. Cat, but the feeling is not reciprocated.
 Eugly (voiced by Rémi Chapotot) - Pretty's fraternal twin sister, who is the opposite of her. She is fat and ugly, but she is extremely kind. Eugly is very emotional, and will burst into tears at even the slightest insult. She eventually becomes Quack-Quack's girlfriend.
 Olaf (voiced by Féodor Atkine) - An emperor penguin whose goal in life is to rule the world and cover it in ice. He is "married" to an ice cube, named Olga, and he owns a robot named Serguei. He used to live with many other emperor penguins, who ostracized him for wishing to marry an ice cube.

Minor 
 Olga - She is Olaf's wife. She is really just an ice cube, but Olaf treats her like a real live person, Olga is a blue ice cube, kept inside a dome to prevent her from melting.
 Serguei - He is Olaf's robot slave, He is also very strong, and he can easily beat up the characters when given commands by Olaf. However, he can be controlled if somebody has a remote control, as seen when Stumpy and Mr. Cat took control of his body to make Olaf's team lose a baseball game.
 Mini-Sergueis- They are miniature versions of Serguei, who serve as henchmen to Olaf.
 Ursula (voiced by Sophie Michard) - She is the new girlfriend of Stumpy, Ursula appears to be a very sweet and kind girl who cares a lot about her loved ones and will do anything for them, She's a Cat or Squirrel.
 The Sheep - They are actually aliens pretending to be sheep, They have the distinction of having more and more presence as the seasons go on, as well as noticeable changes in appearance.
 Death - a black and white female demon sheep, who killed Kaeloo's wife, Adèle.
 The Sphinx (voiced by Philippe Spiteri) - The sphinx has the body of an orange cat with black feet and brown stripes, His head is blue-gray and he has white wings. He has a orange beak like a duck. He wears dark purple fingerless gloves, a pair of thin black square glasses and a red bowtie.
 Adèle - She was Kaeloo's favorite flower and wife, when Quack-Quack accidentally steps on her while saving Kaeloo, Stumpy, and Mr. Cat from a fatal accident, and is subsequently reaped by Death.
 Jean-Guillaume (voiced by Emmanuel Garijo) - He is Kaeloo's psychotherapist, and she frequently calls him and asks for advice, especially on the subject of controlling her transformations, As the show never shows any characters apart from the main and secondary characters, Jean-Guillaume is always off-screen, and as a result is never seen.
 Friedrich - He is Mr. Cat's sausage supplier, that Friedrich is merely a figment of Mr. Cat's imagination, As the show never shows any characters apart from the main and secondary characters, Friedrich is always off-screen, and as a result is never seen, It was once suggested that he is actually Mr. Cat's imaginary friend, and if that is true, he does not have a physical appearance because he isn't real, He often has minor roles in the show, most of which involve him cooking and delivering sausages to Mr. Cat.
 Prehistoric Kaeloo (voiced by Emmanuel Garijo) - Prehistoric version of Kaeloo.
 Prehistoric Stumpy (voiced by Rémi Chapotot) - Prehistoric version of Stumpy.
 Prehistoric Quack-Quack (voiced by Rémi Chapotot) - Prehistoric version of Quack-Quack.
 Prehistoric Mr. Cat (voiced by Philippe Spiteri) - Prehistoric version of Mr. Cat.
 Parallel Kaeloo (voiced by Emmanuel Garijo) - Parallel version of Kaeloo.
 Parallel Stumpy (voiced by Rémi Chapotot) - Parallel version of Stumpy.
 Mr. Duck (voiced by Rémi Chapotot) - Parallel version of Quack-Quack.
 Meow-Meow (voiced by Philippe Spiteri) - Parallel version of Mr. Cat.
 Karl (voiced by Emmanuel Garijo) - He is one of Kaeloo's cousins.
 Kurt (voiced by Emmanuel Garijo) - He is one of Kaeloo's cousins.
 Kevin (voiced by Emmanuel Garijo) - He is one of Kaeloo's cousins.
 Jack (voiced by Emmanuel Garijo) - He is one of Kaeloo's cousins.
 Jamos (voiced by Emmanuel Garijo) - He is one of Kaeloo's cousins.

Episodes

Series overview

Pilot (2007) 
Kaeloo was originally a three-minute short film animation created in 2007, titled Kaelou: Red Light, Green Light, 1, 2, 3 (Kaelou: 1, 2, 3 Je Te Saigne!!!) and presented to the MIP TV in the same year. It is widely considered the pilot of the series.

Season 1 (2010–11)

Season 2 (2012–13) 
A second season was made and aired in France, but it has not yet been dubbed into English, the sole exception being the episode "What if We Played at Riding Ponies?".

Special Episode (2016) 
This special episode is a 26-minute animated TV movie directed by Rémi Chapotot and Philippe Rolland broadcast on December 18, 2016 on Télétoon+.

Season 3 (2017–18) 
The third season was released in France on September 4, 2017. It has not yet been dubbed in English.

Season 4 (2019-20) 
The fourth season of the show will premiere on December 25, 2019. It has not yet been dubbed in English.

Season 5 (2023) 
The existence of a fifth season was revealed at Annecy 2021. Season 5 will have 39 episodes and will premiere on Spring until Summer 2023.

Dissemination and reception 
The launch of the series was made June 6, 2010 in the show on Cartoon + in Canal+ Family. The show is also broadcast on Canal+. Kaeloo is also distributed outside the show on Canal+ Family. The series has received good reviews from Télérama TV 2 Weeks and Télérama considering it "hilarious" and TV two weeks as "a fast-paced cartoon and humor pest, which accomplishes the feat to entertain young and old".

DVD release 
Kaeloo: Hide and Hunt was released on Region 4 DVD by Beyond Home Entertainment on 1 December 2011. It contains the first 13 episodes of Series 1.

International broadcasts

Awards and nominations

References

External links 
 Official website
 
 

2010s French animated television series
2020s French animated television series
2010 French television series debuts
French children's animated comedy television series
French children's animated adventure television series
French computer-animated television series
Computer-animated television series
Parody television series
Censored television series
French-language television shows
Animated television series about frogs
Animated television series about squirrels
Animated television series about ducks
Animated television series about cats
Animated television series about children
Works about friendship
Talking animals in fiction
Television series about shapeshifting
Television series set in fictional countries
Television series set on fictional islands
Television series set on fictional planets